The Orderly is a 1961 Italian comedy film directed by Giorgio Bianchi.

Cast 

 Vittorio De Sica: Colonel Filippo Bitossi 
 Renato Rascel: Remigio De Acutis 
 Dorian Gray: Lauretta 
 Gino Cervi: Maggiore Penna 
 Didi Perego: Valeria Bitossi 
 Andreina Pagnani: Madre di Osvaldo 
 Luigi Pavese: Colonel Terenzi 
 Vicky Ludovici: Nunziatina 
 Vittorio Congia: Domenico Damiani 
 Lelio Luttazzi: Lt. Marchetti  
 Franco Giacobini 
 Ciccio Barbi  
 Olimpia Cavalli

References

External links

1961 comedy films
1961 films
Italian comedy films
Films directed by Giorgio Bianchi
Films scored by Armando Trovajoli
Military humor in film
1960s Italian-language films
1960s Italian films